Ambrose Senyshyn, O.S.B.M, D.D. (February 23, 1903 - September 11, 1976),  born in Staryi Sambir, Ukraine, was an Archbishop of the Ukrainian Catholic Church.  On July 10, 1958, he was appointed the first Bishop of Stamford.  On August 14, 1961, he was appointed Archbishop of Philadelphia. He was succeeded by Joseph M. Schmondiuk as Bishop of Stamford and as Archbishop of Philadelphia.

External links
Catholic-Hierarchy
Diocese of Stamford, Connecticut
Archdiocese of Philadelphia

Participants in the Second Vatican Council
1903 births
1976 deaths
People from Staryi Sambir
People from the Kingdom of Galicia and Lodomeria
Ukrainian Austro-Hungarians
Austro-Hungarian emigrants to the United States
Bishops in Pennsylvania
Bishops in Connecticut
Eastern Catholic bishops in the United States
Ukrainian Eastern Catholics
Eastern Catholic archeparchs in North America
Archbishops of the Ukrainian Greek Catholic Church